The green heron (Butorides virescens) is a small heron of North and Central America. Butorides is from Middle English butor "bittern" and Ancient Greek -oides, "resembling", and virescens is Latin for "greenish".

It was long considered conspecific with its sister species the striated heron (Butorides striata), and together they were called "green-backed heron". Birds of the nominate subspecies (no matter which taxonomic arrangement is preferred) are extremely rare vagrants to western Europe—for example, a sighting in Pembrokeshire in 2018 was only the second recorded sighting in Wales; individuals from the Pacific coast of North America may similarly stray as far as Hawaii.

Description

The neck is often pulled in tight against the body. Adults have a glossy, greenish-black cap, a greenish back and wings that are grey-black grading into green or blue, a chestnut neck with a white line down the front, grey underparts and short yellow legs. The bill is dark with a long, sharp point. Female adults tend to be smaller than males, and have duller and lighter plumage, particularly in the breeding season. Juveniles are duller, with the head sides, neck and underparts streaked brown and white, tan-splotched back and wing coverts, and greenish-yellow legs and bill. Hatchlings are covered in down feathers, light grey above, and white on the belly.

The green heron's call is a loud and sudden ; it also makes a series of more subdued  calls. During courtship, the male gives a  call with wide-open bill, makes noisy wingbeats and  calls in flight, and sometimes calls  to the female before landing again. While sitting, an  courtship call is also given.

Measurements:

 Length: 
 Weight: 
 Wingspan:

Taxonomy
As noted above, this species was formerly included in B. striata, which at that time was erroneously known as B. striatus. The Early Pleistocene B. validipes, whose fossil remains were discovered in Florida, might have been the ancestor of the green heron as the living species seems to replace the extinct relative in the fossil record.

Subspecies distinction is uncertain at best. The color variation between populations is less pronounced than between birds of the same population. Migratory populations are longer-winged than those resident year-round, but this cannot be used to delimit subspecies as it is quite obviously a consequence of differing habits and can be expected to undergo convergent evolution in unrelated populations of this species that just share the same habits. Thus, thorough molecular phylogenetic studies would be required to resolve the question of subspecies delimitation.

The following subspecies are commonly listed, though the validity of most of them is seriously disputed:
 Butorides virescens anthonyi (Mearns, 1895)
Breeds in the United States west of the Rocky Mountains, south to northern Baja California Peninsula, Mexico. Some resident, most migrate to western Mexico in winter.
 Butorides virescens bahamensis (Brewster, 1888)
Bahamas. Resident.
 Butorides virescens frazari (Brewster, 1888)
Southern Baja California Peninsula, Mexico. Resident.
 Butorides virescens maculata (Boddaert, 1783) – formerly maculatus
Southernmost US through Central America to central Panama, Caribbean. Resident.
 Butorides virescens virescens (Linnaeus, 1758)
Breeds from southeastern Canada to central and southern US east of the Rocky Mountains. Winters from southernmost US to northern South America.

Much of the dispute hinges upon the distinctness of the Caribbean and Central American populations, the second taxon in this species to be described. To describe the two most extreme views, some authors assemble the bulk of the mainland population in the nominate subspecies but treat the parapatric populations as distinct subspecies, while others place all resident populations in maculata and all migratory ones in virescens.

Ecology

The habitat of the green heron is small wetlands in low-lying areas. The species is most conspicuous during dusk and dawn, and if anything these birds are nocturnal rather than diurnal, preferring to retreat to sheltered areas in daytime. They feed actively during the day, however, if hungry or provisioning young. Shore-living individuals adapt to the rhythm of the tides. They mainly eat small fish, frogs and aquatic arthropods, but may take any invertebrate or vertebrate prey they can catch, including such animals like leeches, earthworms, dragonflies, damselflies, waterbugs, grasshoppers, spiders, crayfish, prawns, mice, other rodents, lizards, tadpoles and snakes. Some of the many fish eaten are: minnows, sunfish, catfish, perch, eels and, in urban areas, goldfish. Green herons are intolerant of other birds – including conspecifics – when feeding and are not seen to forage in groups. They typically stand still on shore or in shallow water or perch upon branches and await prey. Sometimes they drop food, insects, or other small objects on the water's surface to attract fish, making them one of the few known tool-using species. This feeding method has led some to title the green and closely related striated heron as among the world's most intelligent birds. They are able to hover briefly to catch prey.

The northern population moves to its breeding ranges during March and April; near the northernmost limit of the green heron's range, breeding is well underway by the end of May. The migration to the winter quarters starts in September; by late October, the birds are absent from regions where they do not stay all year. At least the northward migration does not seem to be affected by global warming; birds appear in their breeding ranges at the same time they did 100 years ago.

Individuals of non-migratory populations abandon their territories after breeding season to roam about the region. They may or may not return to the previous year's breeding location, depending on whether they found better habitat during these wanderings. In these populations, the breeding season is determined by rainfall and consequent prey availability.

Green herons are seasonally monogamous. The pairs form in the breeding range, after an intense courtship display by the males, who select the nesting sites and fly in front of the female noisily and with puffed-up head and neck plumage. They nest in forest and swamp patches, over water or in plants near water. Nests are a platform of sticks, often in shrubs or trees, sometimes on the ground. Rarely, large numbers of these birds congregate in heronries for nesting.

The clutch is usually 2–6 pale green eggs, which are laid in 2-day intervals (though the second egg may be laid up to 6 days later than the first). After the last egg has been laid, both parents incubate for about 19–21 days until hatching, and feed the young birds. The frequency of feedings decreases as the offspring near fledging. The young sometimes start to leave the nest at 16 days of age, but are not fully fledged and able to fend for themselves until 30–35 days old. Sometimes – particularly in the tropical parts of its range – the green heron breeds twice a year.

Tool use
Green herons are one of the few species of bird known to use tools. In particular, they commonly use bread crusts, insects, or other items as bait. The bait is dropped onto the surface of a body of water to lure fish. When a fish takes the bait, the green heron then grabs and eats the fish.  When green herons catch large frogs, they drown them before swallowing them whole.

Gallery

References

External links

 Butorides virescens – Green heron at Animal Diversity Web
 Green heron – Butorides virescens – USGS Patuxent Bird Identification InfoCenter
 Green heron at eNature.com
 Field Guide on Flickr

 YouTube video of a green heron fishing
 YouTube Video of a Green Heron drowning a frog before eating it!
 Bermuda Dept. of Environment and Natural Resources green heron page
 
 
 

Green heron
Green heron
Birds of the United States
Birds of Canada
Birds of Panama
Birds of Puerto Rico
Birds of the Dominican Republic
Birds of Trinidad and Tobago
Tool-using animals
Birds described in 1758
Taxa named by Carl Linnaeus
Extant Pleistocene first appearances
Taxobox binomials not recognized by IUCN